Abraham Cohen may refer to:

 Abraham Cohen de Herrera (c. 1570–c. 1635), religious philosopher and Kabbalist (Amsterdam)
 Abraham Cohen Pimentel (died 1697), Orthodox rabbi (Amsterdam)
 Abraham Cohen of Zante (1670–1729), physician, poet, rabbi (Venetian Republic)
 Abraham Cohen Labatt (1802–1899), American pioneer of Reform Judaism
 Abraham Burton Cohen (1882–1956), American civil engineer
 Abraham Cohen (editor) (1887–1957), rabbinical editor of the Soncino Books of the Bible

See also
 Abe Cohen (1933–2001), American football player
 Abraham Cohn (1832–1897), American Civil War soldier and Medal of Honor recipient
 Abraham Kohn (1807–1848), Chief Reform Rabbi of Lemberg (now Lviv)